Wheelersburg High School (WHS) is a public high school in Wheelersburg, Ohio, United States. It is the only high school in the Wheelersburg Local School District, which is located in Porter Township along the northern bank of the Ohio River in Southern Ohio.  Wheelersburg's mascot is the Pirates and their school colors are orange and black.

The district is bordered by the Bloom-Vernon Local School District and the Minford Local School District to the north along Ohio 140, the Green Local School District to the east along U.S. 52 and Ohio 522 (before entering Lawrence County), and the Portsmouth City School District to the west.

Students entered a new K-12 academic building during the 2008–2009 school year.

Academics
Wheelersburg High School won the Ohio Academic Competition in 1985 and 1986.  The school also won the 1984 National Academic Championship.

For the past five years, the Wheelersburg High School has received an "Excellent" rating on the State of Ohio's Local Report Card.

Athletics
There are ten school districts and eleven high schools in Scioto County along with one parochial school as well as several private and community schools.  The school's athletic affiliation is with the Ohio High School Athletic Association (OHSAA) and the Southern Ohio Conference (SOC), which has seventeen member schools and is divided into two divisions (SOC I & SOC II) based on the schools' enrollment. The SOC includes teams from four different Ohio counties - Jackson County (Oak Hill High School), Lawrence County (Saint Joseph Central High School and Symmes Valley High School), Pike County (Waverly High School, Eastern High School, and Western High School), and Scioto County (Clay High School, Green High School, Glenwood High School, Sciotoville Community School, Valley High School, Northwest High School, Minford High School, Portsmouth West High School, Notre Dame High School, South Webster High School, and Wheelersburg High School).

See also Ohio High School Athletic Conferences and the Southern Ohio Conference

Ohio High School Athletic Association championships and appearances

Boys' Baseball
OHSAA State Championships
1996 (def. Middlefield Cardinal 4-1), 
2012 (def. Lima Central Catholic 1-0)
2013 (def. Bloom-Carroll 5-4)
In 2015, Wheelersburg Baseball became the first OHSAA team ever to win 6 straight regional championships from 2010 to 2015.
Boys' Basketball
OHSAA State Runner-up
1984 - (d. Willard 70-64 & lost to Akron St. Vincent - St. Mary 75-71 to finish season at 23-5)
1995 - (d. Columbus Bishop Hartley 76-60 & lost to Orrville 79-50 to finish season at 23-4)
OHSAA Final Four Appearances
1982 - Youngstown Rayen d. Wheelersburg 61-45)
1989 - (Cincinnati North College Hill d. Wheelersburg 71-67 (2OT))
2006 - (Cleveland Cleveland Villa Angela-St. Joseph d. Wheelersburg 71-62)
2007 - (Cincinnati North College Hill d. Wheelersburg 69-66 
Football
 OHSAA State Championship
1989 (def. Warren John F. Kennedy 14-7)
2017 (def. Pemberville Eastwood 21-14OT)
Girls' Softball
OHSAA State Runner-up
2004 (d. Archbold 2-1 & lost to Woodsfield Monroe Central 1-0 to finish season at 25-6), 
OHSAA Division III State Champions
2016 (d. Johnstown-Monroe, 1-0, within the state semifinals, and then d. South Range, 8-3, within the championship final. The Pirates finished the season 26-2.
2022 (d. Cardington-Lincoln, 5-2, within the state semifinals, and then d. Tuslaw, 5-2, within the championship final. The Pirates finished the season 27-1.

Notable alumni
 George Washington Rightmire, President of Ohio State University 1925-1938
 Seth Morrison Class of 2006 - Lead Guitarist Skillet
 Josh Newman Class of 2000 - Former MLB pitcher and current assistant baseball coach at Penn State Nittany Lions
 Rohit Kataria Class of 2020 - Former contestant, Season 35 Jeopardy! Teen Tournament
 Redonda Miller, MD, MBA Class of 1984 - President of The Johns Hopkins Hospital 2016-

References

External links

 

High schools in Scioto County, Ohio
Public high schools in Ohio